Edmund V. Ludwig (May 20, 1928 – May 17, 2016) was a United States district judge of the United States District Court for the Eastern District of Pennsylvania.

Early life and education

Born in Philadelphia, Pennsylvania, Ludwig received an Artium Baccalaureus degree from Harvard University in 1949 and a Bachelor of Laws from Harvard Law School in 1952. He was a Reserve Captain in the Army JAG Corps from 1953 to 1956, before returning to private practice in Philadelphia, and later Doylestown, Pennsylvania.

Legal career

Ludwig was elected a Judge on the Bucks County Court of Common Pleas in 1968, and went to serve as a Clinical associate professor at Hahnemann University, and a visiting lecturer at Temple University Beasley School of Law in the late 1970s and early 1980s. Ludwig also briefly served as a member of the University of Pennsylvania's faculty in the early 1980s, and held a variety of positions at Villanova University School of Law in the late 1970s.

Federal judicial service

Ludwig  was nominated by President Ronald Reagan to a seat on the United States District Court for the Eastern District of Pennsylvania on June 21, 1985. The seat was vacated by the retiring former Lieutenant Governor Raymond J. Broderick. He was confirmed by the United States Senate on October 16, 1985, and received his commission on October 17, 1985. He assumed senior status on May 20, 1997, serving in that status until his death on May 17, 2016, in Doylestown, Pennsylvania.

References

External links
 

1928 births
2016 deaths
Drexel University faculty
Harvard Law School alumni
Judges of the Pennsylvania Courts of Common Pleas
Judges of the United States District Court for the Eastern District of Pennsylvania
Lawyers from Philadelphia
Temple University faculty
United States district court judges appointed by Ronald Reagan
20th-century American judges
United States Army officers
University of Pennsylvania faculty
Villanova University alumni
Wasserstein Fellows
Villanova University faculty